M2613 is a nonsteroidal estrogen derived from triphenylbromoethylene which was studied in the treatment of breast cancer in women in the 1940s but was never marketed.

See also
 Estrobin

References

Abandoned drugs
Hormonal antineoplastic drugs
Organobromides
Synthetic estrogens
Triphenylethylenes